Maria José Bertolotti (born 30 April 1966), sometimes known as just Zézé is a Brazilian basketball player. She competed in the women's tournament at the 1992 Summer Olympics.

References

External links
 

1966 births
Living people
Brazilian women's basketball players
Olympic basketball players of Brazil
Basketball players at the 1992 Summer Olympics
Basketball players from São Paulo